Aneta Siemiginowska is a Polish-American astrophysicist whose research involves high-energy cosmic objects including supermassive black hole, quasars, blazars, active galaxies, and astrophysical jets. She works at the Center for Astrophysics  Harvard & Smithsonian as a senior astrophysicist in the Chandra X-ray Center.

Education and career
Siemiginowska wanted to be an astronomer from a very young age. She has a master's degree from the University of Warsaw, and a Ph.D. from the Nicolaus Copernicus Astronomical Center of the Polish Academy of Sciences. She came to the Harvard–Smithsonian Center for Astrophysics as a postdoctoral researcher, before obtaining a staff astrophysicist position there.

Recognition
Siemiginowska was named a Legacy Fellow of the American Astronomical Society in 2020.

References

External links
Home page

Year of birth missing (living people)
Living people
American astrophysicists
American women astronomers
American women physicists
Polish astrophysicists
Polish women physicists
Women astrophysicists
University of Warsaw alumni
Harvard–Smithsonian Center for Astrophysics people
Fellows of the American Astronomical Society